Cloverleaf is a census-designated place (CDP) in east central Harris County, Texas, United States. The population was 24,100 at the 2020 census.

History
Cloverleaf originated as a stop on the Beaumont, Sour Lake, and Western Railway. A 1936 county highway map indicates an unnamed development that became Cloverleaf. The Handbook of Texas states that a post office may have existed for a short period of time around 1950. In 1990, Cloverleaf had 18,230 residents and 18 churches.

Geography

Cloverleaf is located at  (29.784676, -95.172959). The community is located between the city of Jacinto City and the Channelview CDP along Interstate 10.

Demographics

As of the 2020 United States census, there were 24,100 people, 7,087 households, and 5,743 families residing in the CDP. At the 2000 census there were 23,508 people, 7,287 households, and 5,800 families in the CDP. The population density was 6,589.2 people per square mile (2,542.4/km). There were 7,865 housing units at an average density of 2,204.5/sq mi (850.6/km).

In 2000, the racial makup of the CDP was 58.77% White, 16.11% African American, 0.59% Native American, 1.51% Asian, 0.05% Pacific Islander, 20.27% from other races, and 2.71% from two or more races. Hispanic or Latino of any race were 44.34%. By 2020, non-Hispanic whites declined to 11.74% of the population, and Hispanics or Latinos of any race grew to 77.2% of the population.

In 2000, the median household income was $37,449 and the median family income  was $40,231. Males had a median income of $30,958 versus $25,044 for females. The per capita income for the CDP was $16,245. About 15.6% of families and 20.3% of the population were below the poverty line, including 26.8% of those under age 18 and 4.9% of those age 65 or over. In 2020, the median household income increased to $49,276.

Government and infrastructure
The Harris Health System (formerly Harris County Hospital District) designated the Settegast Health Center in southeast Houston for the ZIP code 77015. The designated public hospital is Lyndon B. Johnson General Hospital in northeast Houston.

Education 
Cloverleaf is zoned to schools in the Galena Park Independent School District.

Elementary schools in the Cloverleaf CDP include Cloverleaf Elementary School, Green Valley Elementary School, Havard Elementary School, Sam Houston Elementary School, and North Shore Elementary School. All residents are zoned to Cobb 6th Grade School, which is located outside the CDP. Most residents are zoned to North Shore Middle School, in the CDP, for grades 7 through 8; some residents are zoned to Cunningham Middle School, outside the CDP, instead. All residents are zoned to North Shore Senior High School for grades 9 through 12.

In 1990, Cloverleaf had two elementary schools, one junior high school, and one high school.

Residents of Galena Park ISD (and therefore Cloverleaf CDP) are zoned to San Jacinto College.

See also
Cloverleaf quasar

References

External links
 

Census-designated places in Harris County, Texas
Census-designated places in Texas
Greater Houston